Paul Howard (born 1 April 1967 in Stevenage, England) is a  children's illustrator. He provided the illustrations for The Bravest Ever Bear, written by Allan Ahlberg, which won a Blue Peter Book Award. He has also worked with such well-known authors as 
Anne Fine, Gene Kemp, Joan Lingard, Penelope Lively, Jan Mark and Jenny Nimmo, among others, as well as illustrating several volumes in the Animal Ark Pets series.

References

External links

 Paul Howard at publisher Egmont
 

English illustrators
People from Stevenage
1967 births
Living people